Dear Reality GmbH is a German company specialising in 3D audio software and Virtual acoustics. They have developed Software tools for professional audio production of linear and interactive content in Augmented reality, Virtual reality, Video games, Sound design and Music.

History 
The company was founded by Christian Sander and Achim Fell in Düsseldorf, Germany 2014. In 2018'' Sennheiser invested in Dear Reality.

Products
Dear Reality is mainly known for its 3D audio mixing plugins; (stylised dearVR) DearVR Music, DearVR Pro and DearVR Spatial Connect.

References

External links 
 

German brands
Audio effects
Digital audio